CFMS may refer to:

 Canadian Federation of Medical Students, the national body that represents medical undergraduate trainees across Canada
 Canadian Forces Medical Service, the medical support for the Canadian Forces both at home and abroad
 CFMS-FM, a radio station in Markham, Ontario, Canada
 California Federation of Mineralogical Societies